Andoversford and Dowdeswell railway station was on the Midland and South Western Junction Railway in Gloucestershire. The station opened to passengers on 1 August 1891 with the opening of the section of the line between Cirencester Watermoor and the junction at Andoversford with the Great Western Railway's Cheltenham Lansdown to Banbury line, which had opened in 1881.

History

Andoversford and Dowdeswell was originally called just "Dowdeswell", though the station was much nearer the village of Andoversford. It was renamed about a year after it opened. The station owed its existence to the awkward relations between the M&SWJR and the GWR: though the Great Western allowed the newer line running powers over its line from Cheltenham to Andoversford junction, it did not allow the M&SWJR to stop its trains at Andoversford railway station. The GWR relented in 1904, but by then Andoversford and Dowdeswell was already built, and M&SWJR trains then stopped at both.

The Grouping of 1923 rationalised the situation. The M&SWJR was allocated to the GWR, and four years later the new owners closed Andoversford and Dowdeswell station to passengers.

On nationalisation in 1948 British Railways operated the remaining goods service and passenger trains which continued to pass the station until closure of the line in 1961. After its closure to passengers the station remained opened for goods traffic for a further 35 years to October 1962, outliving the rest of the M&SWJR, which had closed the previous year.

The site today

The station building was used for some years afterwards as a transport cafe, but all trace has now gone.

References

 
 
 
 Station on navigable O.S. map: site is just south of three way junction.

Disused railway stations in Gloucestershire
Former Midland and South Western Junction Railway stations
Railway stations in Great Britain opened in 1891
Railway stations in Great Britain closed in 1927